Julia Louis-Dreyfus has been nominated for nine Golden Globe Awards, winning one for Best Supporting Actress in a Series, Miniseries, or Television Film for her role as Elaine Benes on Seinfeld (1995). She has also been nominated for twenty-one Screen Actors Guild Awards and has won five for individual performance (nine all together) for her portrayals on Seinfeld (1997–98) and Veep (2014, 2017–18).

Additionally, she has won the Primetime Emmy Award for Outstanding Lead Actress in a Comedy Series seven times; once for her role on The New Adventures of Old Christine (2006) and six consecutive wins for playing Selina Meyer on Veep (2012–17), as well as Outstanding Supporting Actress in a Comedy Series on one occasion for Seinfeld (1996). As of 2017, she holds the record for the most Primetime Emmy wins as an actor for the same role and is tied with Cloris Leachman for the most acting Primetime Emmy wins (with eight).

In 2018, she was the twentieth recipient of the Mark Twain Prize for American Humor.

Major associations

Primetime Emmy Awards
The Primetime Emmy Award is an American award bestowed by the Academy of Television Arts & Sciences in recognition of excellence in American primetime television programming. Louis-Dreyfus has received eleven awards from twenty six nominations.

Golden Globe Awards
The Golden Globe Awards are accolades bestowed by the 93 members of the Hollywood Foreign Press Association, recognizing excellence in film and television, both domestic and foreign. Louis-Dreyfus has received one award from nine nominations.

Screen Actors Guild Awards
The Screen Actors Guild Award is an accolade given by the Screen Actors Guild‐American Federation of Television and Radio Artists (SAG-AFTRA) to recognize outstanding performances in film and primetime television. Louis-Dreyfus has received nine awards from twenty-one nominations.

Industry awards

American Comedy Awards
The American Comedy Awards are a group of awards presented annually in the United States recognizing performances and performers in the field of comedy, with an emphasis on television comedy and comedy films. Louis-Dreyfus has received five awards from ten nominations.

Critics' Choice Awards
The Critics' Choice Awards—both film and television—are accolades presented by the Broadcast Film Critics Association (BTJA) (US). Louis-Dreyfus has received two awards from six nominations.

People's Choice Awards
The People's Choice Awards is an American awards show, recognizing the people and the work of popular culture, voted on by the general public. Louis-Dreyfus has received six nominations.

Producers Guild of America Awards
The Producers Guild of America Award was originally established in 1990 by the Producers Guild of America as the Golden Laurel Awards, created by PGA Treasurer Joel Freeman with the support of Guild President Leonard Stern, in order to honor the visionaries who produce and execute motion picture and television product. Louis-Dreyfus has received four nominations.

Satellite Awards
The Satellite Awards are annual awards given by the International Press Academy that are commonly noted in entertainment industry journals and blogs. Louis-Dreyfus has received ten nominations.

Television Critics Association Awards
The TCA Awards are awards presented by the Television Critics Association in recognition of excellence in television. Louis-Dreyfus has received one award from seven nominations.

Note

References

Louis-Dreyfus, Julia